Annemarie Ackermann (May 16, 1913 – February 18, 1994) was a German politician of the Christian Democratic Union (CDU) and former member of the German Bundestag.

Life 
Annemarie Ackermann was a member of the German Bundestag for the first time from 1953 to 1961. On January 16, 1965, she succeeded Gerhard Fritz, who had resigned, as a member of the Bundestag, where she remained until the end of the fourth term in October 1965. She always entered the Bundestag via the CDU state list for Rhineland-Palatinate.

Literature

References

1913 births
1994 deaths
Members of the Bundestag for Rhineland-Palatinate
Members of the Bundestag 1961–1965
Members of the Bundestag 1957–1961
Members of the Bundestag 1953–1957
Female members of the Bundestag
20th-century German women politicians
Members of the Bundestag for the Christian Democratic Union of Germany